Genetics in Medicine is a monthly peer-reviewed medical journal covering medical genetics. It is the official journal of the American College of Medical Genetics and Genomics (ACMG). It was established in 1998 and has been published jointly by Nature Publishing Group on behalf of the ACMG since 2012, though it was originally published by Lippincott Williams & Wilkins. The editor-in-chief is Robert D. Steiner MD (University of Wisconsin-Madison).

Abstracting and indexing
The journal is abstracted and indexed in:
Current Contents/Life Sciences
EMBASE
Elsevier BIOBASE
Medline/Index Medicus
Science Citation Index Expanded
According to the Journal Citation Reports, the journal had a 2020 impact factor of 8.822, ranking it 15th out of 175 journals in the category "Genetics & Heredity".

References

External links

Medical genetics journals
Nature Research academic journals
Monthly journals
Publications established in 1998
English-language journals
Academic journals associated with learned and professional societies